Among the Hidden by Margaret Peterson Haddix is a young adult novel published on September 1, 1998 and is the first book in the Shadow Children series.

The book tells the story of a fictional future in which drastic measures have been taken to quell overpopulation. In 2013, it was one of the ten most taught texts in United States' middle schools.

Plot summary

In a dystopian future, after a food shortage and overpopulation, families are limited to two children.

Luke Garner, a 12-year-old boy,  lives on a farm with his mother, father, and two brothers. As a third child, Luke and his parents are in violation of a population law. Luke, like all third children, must spend his days hidden or away from public view, or else he will be killed or imprisoned, as well as his family. When the government starts building houses in the woods behind the Garners' house for the rich and elite, Luke is forced to stay indoors, alone during the day.

One day, Luke sees the face of kid in a window of a house that he knows already has two children. About a month later, he runs over to the house out of curiosity and is caught by the child he saw in the window, Jen Talbot. She reveals that she is also a third child. Jen introduces Luke to a chatroom for other third children - they call themselves Shadow Children. The two become friends and Luke visits Jen as much as he can.

Jen, who strongly disagrees with the government, tries to persuade Luke that the government is wrong. Later, at home, he begins to feel guilty for taking up food and supplies that could be used for other people. Jen tells Luke of a rally. Luke refuses to go, saying that he's too scared. Jen gets upset and tells him to leave. He is angry at her and wishes that the Population Police would shoot her during the rally. After thinking that, he realizes that he shouldn't have thought that. That night, she sneaks over to his house and they reconcile before she says goodbye.

The next morning, Luke is paranoid about what has happened. There has been no report of any rally. Growing more afraid of what may have happened to Jen, he breaks into her home again, but there is no sign of her. He runs into the computer room and logs into the chatroom. He sends a message in the chatroom asking if anyone knows what became of her, but there is no reply.

A man steps into the room with a gun. He asks who Luke is and how he knows Jen. Luke reveals himself as another Shadow Child who is friends with Jen and demands to know where Jen is. The man, who is Jen's father, lowers the gun. He explains that Jen and forty other children were shot and killed in the rally.

The Population Police suddenly turn up and demand to come in. The government had begun monitoring the chatroom after the rally. Luke hides while Mr. Talbot diffuses the situation.

Mr. Talbot forges a fake I.D. for Luke so he can move away, and Luke begins a new life as Lee Grant. He begins going to a boarding school.

Reception
Among the Hidden received many accolades:

 1998, American Library Association, Best Books for Young Adults
 2002, Pennsylvania Young Readers' Choice Award for Grades 6-8 
 2001, Sunshine State Young Readers Award for Grades 6-8
 2001, California Young Readers Medal for Middle School/Junior High 
 2018, Bluestem Book Award Nominee

References

1998 American novels

Dystopian novels
1990s science fiction novels
American young adult novels